The 1956 Navy Midshipmen football team represented the United States Naval Academy (USNA) as an independent during the 1956 NCAA University Division football season. The team was led by seventh-year head coach Eddie Erdelatz.

Schedule

References

Navy
Navy Midshipmen football seasons
Navy Midshipmen football